Swimmer (スイマ一) is a vertically scrolling arcade game from Tehkan, published in Japan in 1982. It was licensed to Centuri for distribution in North America. The gameplay involves swimming up a river while avoiding logs and various marine life.

Gameplay

The player collects fruit to score points and power up to knock enemies out. Players can swim from side to side to avoid obstacles, or they can press a button to dive under them. The aim of the game is to swim until the character reaches the treasure island.

Legacy
In 2005, Swimmer was released for the Xbox as part of the Tecmo Classic Arcade collection.

See also
Toobin'

References

1982 video games
Arcade video games
Arcade-only video games
Tecmo games
Multiplayer and single-player video games
Vertically-oriented video games
Video games developed in Japan